GS Caltex Corporation is a South Korean oil refiner jointly owned by Chevron and GS Group. The company was founded in May 1967 as the first private oil company in Korea. The company changed its name from LG-Caltex Oil Corporation to GS Caltex Corporation in 2005 as part of the GS Group split from LG Corporation.

Production Base
 Kero-Diesel  Hydrodesulfurization Facilities : GS Caltex desulfurizes  of kerosene and diesel each day.

Business Domain
 Petrochemicals : GS Caltex constructed a polypropylene plant in 1988. That was followed by expansion into the aromatics business in 1990. Currently, GS Caltex manufactures basic petrochemicals.
GS Caltex produces  of lubricants per day and 8,000 million tonne per year of grease products.

See also
 Caltex
 GS Caltex Seoul KIXX

References

External links
 

GS Group
Chevron Corporation
Oil companies of South Korea